hot seat or hotseat may refer to:
 A slang term for the electric chair
 Hot Seat (film), 2022 action filler
 Hot Seat (game show), on ABC
 Hot Seat (talk show), political talk show hosted by Wally George
 Hot Seat (G.I. Joe), a fictional character in the G.I. Joe universe
 Hotseat (multiplayer mode), in computer games when players take consecutive turns in a single "seat"
 Hot Seat, a pricing game on the game show The Price Is Right
 Hot seat, the term used for the contestant's chair on the game show Who Wants to Be a Millionaire?
 Millionaire Hot Seat, the 2009 relaunch of the Australian version of Who Wants to Be a Millionaire?
 "Hot Seat", a song by Child's Play from the EP Ruff House